Transformers: War for Cybertron Trilogy is a toyline and transmedia series that is part of the Transformers franchise by Hasbro announced in February 2018.

Toy-line
The toy-line is split into three subline imprints titled “Siege”, “Earthrise”, and “Kingdom” respectively. All of the designs are based on the Generation 1 and Beast Wars series. Mass retail figures are sold in prices ranging from $5USD to $160USD.

Television series

In 2019, Hasbro's production studio, Allspark and Netflix announced a new animated series titled the War for Cybertron Trilogy The series was produced by Rooster Teeth, alongside Allspark Animation and Polygon Pictures. F. J. DeSanto would return as showrunner while George Krstic, Gavin Hignight and Brandon M. Easton joined as writers. The first season was originally set to be released in June 2020, but was rescheduled to July 30, 2020 due to the COVID-19 pandemic. The second season was released on December 30, 2020. The third and final season was released on July 29, 2021.

Polygon Pictures President and CEO Shuzo John Shiota said "We're thrilled to be working with Rooster Teeth, Netflix and Hasbro to bring this fan-oriented More than Meets the Eye story to life. The Transformers universe has so many rich characters and engaging stories. Getting the opportunity to be part of the team bringing the robots in disguise to life in this new trilogy is unbelievable."

Tom Warner, Senior Vice President for the Transformers franchise for Hasbro, said "The Transformers brand is a global phenomenon with toys, consumer products, films, television shows, and literature, resonating with millions of passionate fans around the world. This brand new Netflix series will add to the incredible slate of Transformers offerings with a truly unique story that will delight both existing fans and those being introduced to the wonder of robots in disguise."

Rooster Teeth co-founder and Chief Content Officer Matt Hullum said "Transformers: War for Cybertron Trilogy marks the inaugural production for our Rooster Teeth Studios division and we’re proud to be partnering with and entrusted by Hasbro and Netflix. As fans of these characters, it's been a joy bringing our storytelling and animation expertise to this project. This teaser trailer is just a taste of what’s to come in this series, and we can’t wait to see what the fans think, especially our Rooster Teeth community!"

Chapter 1: Siege 
 Edward Bosco as Ultra Magnus (4 episodes), Soundwave (6 episodes)
 Jake Foushee as Optimus Prime (6 episodes)
 Todd Haberkorn as Red Alert, Shockwave (6 episodes)
 Jason Marnocha as Megatron, Dome Guard (6 episodes)
 Georgia Reed as Chromia (6 episodes)
 Bill Rogers as Wheeljack (6 episodes)
 Linsay Rousseau as Elita-1 (6 episodes)
 Keith Silverstein as Jetfire, Omega Supreme (6 episodes)
 Frank Todaro as Starscream, Refraktor, Ravage, Sparkless Bot (6 episodes)
 Mark Whitten as Sideswipe, Skywarp (6 episodes)
 Brook Chalmers as Impactor, Comms Officer, Sparkless Bot (5 episodes)
 Shawn Hawkins as Mirage (5 episodes)
 Jimmie Stafford as Hound (5 episodes)
 Rafael Goldstein as Ratchet, Soundblaster (4 episodes)
 Kaiser Johnson as Ironhide, Desperate Decepticon, Sparkless Bot (4 episodes)
 Aaron Veach as Prowl (4 episodes)
 Joe Zieja as Bumblebee (4 episodes)
 Brian Robert Burns as Cog (3 episodes)
 Alexander DiLallo as Barricade (3 episodes)
 Philip Bache as Skytread (2 episodes)
 Gray G. Haddock as Spinister (2 episodes)
 Danny Hansen as Thundercracker (2 episodes)
 Sophia Isabella/Jessica DiGiovanni as Arcee (2 episodes)
 Miles Luna as Cliffjumper, Teletraan-1 (2 episodes)
 Ellie Main as Moonracer (2 episodes)
 Ben Jurand as Alpha Trion (1 episode)

Chapter 2: Earthrise 
 Kaiser Johnson as Ironhide, Seeker Guard (6 episodes)
 Jason Marnocha as Megatron (6 episodes), Galvatron (1 episode)
 Frank Todaro as Starscream, Refraktor, Shamble, Ravage (6 episodes)
 Jake Foushee as Optimus Prime (5 episodes)
 Sophia Isabella/Jessica DiGiovanni as Arcee (5 episodes)
 Bill Rogers as Wheeljack (5 episodes)
 Joe Zieja as Bumblebee (5 episodes)
 Edward Bosco as Soundwave, Ultra Magnus, Factory Worker (4 episodes)
 Todd Haberkorn as Red Alert, Shockwave (4 episodes)
 Shawn Hawkins as Mirage, Factory Worker (4 episodes)
 Georgia Reed as Chromia (4 episodes)
 Linsay Rousseau as Elita-1, Deseeus (Doubt) (4 episodes)
 Adin Rudd as Scrapface (4 episodes)
 Keith Silverstein as Jetfire, Omega Supreme, Deseeus (Death) (4 episodes)
 Mark Whitten as Sideswipe (4 episodes)
 Alexander DiLallo as Barricade (3 episodes)
 Rafael Goldstein as Ratchet, Autobot Security Officer (3 episodes)
 Michael Schwalbe as Doubledealer (3 episodes)
 Jolene Andersen as Deseeus (Wrath) (2 episodes)
 Philip Bache as Skytread (2 episodes)
 Michael Dunn as Scorponok (2 episodes)
 Danny Hansen as Thundercracker (2 episodes)
 Miles Luna as Teletraan-1 (2 episodes)
 Jimmie Stafford as Hound (2 episodes)
 Alex Taber as Bug Bite (2 episodes)
 Aaron Veach as Prowl (2 episodes)
 Sean Wright as Sky Lynx, Seeker Guard (2 episodes)
 Brian Robert Burns as Cog (1 episode)
 Gray G. Haddock as Spinister (1 episode)
 Michael Jones as Thrust (1 episode)
 Ben Jurand as Alpha Trion (1 episode)
 Jonathan Lipow as Unicron (1 episode)
 Joseph Noughton as Deseeus (Wisdom) (1 episode)
 Ken Rogers as Exhaust (1 episode)
 Jay Sanford as Dirge, Deseeus (Wit) (1 episode)

Chapter 3: Kingdom 
 Marqus Bobesich as Predacon Megatron (6 episodes)
 Jeanne Carr as Blackarachnia (6 episodes)
 Erin Ebers as Airazor (6 episodes)
 Jake Foushee as Optimus Prime (6 episode), Nemesis Prime (1 episodes)
 Joe Hernandez as Cheetor (6 episodes)
 Jason Marnocha as Megatron (6 episodes), Galvatron (3 episodes)  
 Justin Luther as Optimus Primal (6 episodes)
 Frank Todaro as Starscream, Rattrap, Ravage, Laserbeak (6 episodes)
 Andy Barnett as Rhinox (5 episodes)
 Sophia Isabella/Jessica DiGiovanni as Arcee (5 episodes)
 Bill Rogers as Wheeljack (5 episodes)
 Joe Zieja as Bumblebee (5 episodes)
 Edward Bosco as Soundwave, Ultra Magnus (4 episodes)
 Rafael Goldstein as Ratchet (4 episodes)
 Krizz Kaliko as Dinobot (4 episodes)
 Aaron Veach as Prowl (4 episodes)
 Kaiser Johnson as Ironhide (3 episodes)
 Jonathan Lipow as Unicron (3 episodes)
 Miles Luna as Teletraan-1 / Arkbot (3 episodes) 
 Beau Marie as Tigatron (3 episodes)
 Mark Whitten as Sideswipe (3 episodes)
 Marcus Clark-Oliver as Astrotrain, Hotlink (2 episodes) 
 Shawn Hawkins as Mirage (2 episodes)
 Linsay Rousseau as Elita-1 (2 episodes)
 Jimmie Stafford as Hound (2 episodes)
 Alexander Dilallo as Barricade (1 episode)
 Danny Hansen as Predacon Scorponok (1 episode)

Episodes

Chapter 1: Siege (2020)

Chapter 2: Earthrise (2020)

Chapter 3: Kingdom (2021)

Reception 
On Rotten Tomatoes, the first season, Siege, has an approval rating of 95% based on reviews from 20 critics. The site's consensus is: "Visually stunning, surprisingly deep, and still a lot of fun, War for Cybertron: Siege breathes new life into the Transformers franchise." The second season, Earthrise, has an approval rating of 86% based on reviews from 7 critics. The third season, Kingdom, has an approval rating of 90% based on reviews from 10 critics. The site's consensus is: "Transporting the Autobots into a strange new world, Kingdom brings the War for Cybertron to a satisfying close with great morphing action and a delightful nod to the Beast Wars."

Fans criticized Rooster Teeth for not having the likes of Peter Cullen, Frank Welker or voice actors that were involved with the franchise previously and instead hired "non-union voice talent". Garry Chalk (who previously voiced Optimus Primal) was critical of the voice acting, which he described as "low energy".

References

Notes

External links 
 Transformers: War for Cybertron Trilogy on Transformers Wiki
 

2020 American television series debuts
2021 American television series endings
2020s American animated television series
2020s American science fiction television series
American computer-animated television series
Animated television series about robots
Anime-influenced Western animated television series
English-language Netflix original programming
Netflix original anime
Polygon Pictures
Rooster Teeth franchises
Television productions postponed due to the COVID-19 pandemic
Television series by Hasbro Studios
War for Cybertron
Transformers: Generation 1
Trilogies
War television series